Forceville is a commune in the Somme department in Hauts-de-France in northern France.

Geography
On 18 December 1915 the 107th Company, Machine Gun Corps, was established here as part of the 36th (Ulster) Division.

Population

Places of interest
 The old railway line

See also
Communes of the Somme department

References

Communes of Somme (department)